National Highway 339 (NH 339) is a  National Highway in India.

References

National highways in India